James Chester Bradley (1884 in West Chester, Pennsylvania – 1975 in Ithaca, New York) was an American entomologist who specialised in Hymenoptera.

He graduated from Cornell University (A.B. 1906, Ph.D. 1910) and the University of California (M.S. 1907). He was an assistant professor of entomology at Cornell from 1911–1920, and professor and curator of invertebrate zoology from 1920–1952.

James Chester Bradley wrote very many entomological papers. He is especially known for his works on Evaniidae and Scoliidae.

References
Osborn, H. 1952 A Brief History of Entomology Including Time of Demosthenes and Aristotle to Modern Times with over Five Hundred Portraits. Columbus, Ohio, The Spahr & Glenn Company : 1-303, 58 plates.

External links
 DEI
 James C. Bradley Papers,1905-1962.

American entomologists
Hymenopterists
1975 deaths
1884 births
20th-century American zoologists
Cornell University alumni
University of California, Berkeley alumni
Cornell University faculty